The Stony Creek Branch is a railway line in Montgomery County, Pennsylvania. It runs  from Lansdale, Pennsylvania, to Norristown, Pennsylvania, connecting the Bethlehem and Doylestown Branches with the Norristown Branch. Although SEPTA owns the line, it is freight-only. CSX Transportation, Norfolk Southern Railway, and the Pennsylvania Northeastern Railroad have trackage rights on the branch.

History 
The Stony Creek Railroad was incorporated on April 14, 1868, to build south from the North Pennsylvania Railroad main line at Lansdale along Stony Creek to Norristown, Pennsylvania.

The Philadelphia and Reading Railroad leased the North Pennsylvania on May 14, 1879. The Reading, through the Norristown Junction Railroad, built a connection between Norristown Branch and the Stony Creek Railroad in 1880. Under the Reading, the division point between the two lines shifted north, with the Norristown Branch moving north to include the Norristown–Main Street and  stations.

The Stony Creek Railroad was one of twelve railroads merged into the Reading Company effective December 31, 1945. On the Reading's final bankruptcy in 1976 the branch was conveyed to SEPTA, with Conrail retaining trackage rights. Today, CSX Transportation, Norfolk Southern Railway, and the Pennsylvania Northeastern Railroad have trackage rights on the branch.

Notes

References 
 
 
 
 
 
 

SEPTA Regional Rail lines
Railway lines opened in 1873
Rail infrastructure in Pennsylvania
Reading Company lines
Norfolk Southern Railway lines
CSX Transportation lines